Esencia (Essence) is the tenth studio album recorded by Puerto Rican salsa singer Gilberto Santa Rosa released on November 15, 1996. It was nominated for Best Tropical/Salsa Album at the 9th Lo Nuestro Awards.

Track listing
This information adapted from Allmusic.

Chart performance

Certification

See also
List of number-one Billboard Tropical Albums from the 1990s

References

1996 albums
Gilberto Santa Rosa albums
Sony Discos albums